Khurshid Gohar Qalam was a Pakistani calligrapher. He authored 18 books of calligraphy. His work is displayed in the British Museum in London, Ashmolean museum in Oxford and a Moscow museum.

Personal life
Alam was born in Sargodha district in 1956 and died on 7 december 2020 in lahore. His early education took place in Sargodha. Thereafter he studied under the late calligraphy master Hafiz Muhammad Yousaf Sadidi. The title of Gohar Galam was bestowed on him by calligraphy masters late Nafees raqam, and Ghulam Nizzamuddin.

Some major works
Gohar Qalam is the only Pakistani whose work is on permanent display in the British and Ashmolean museums. His major works include a copy of the Quran placed in the main state mosque known as Faisal mosque in Islamabad and includes 406 styles of calligraphy. The manuscript weighs 1600 kilograms is divided into 30 parts, placed in separate showcases. His calligraphy adorns some of the most important public places in Pakistan, such as the extension of the mosque and tomb complex of the premier saint of south Asia who is buried in Lahore and known as the Data Ganj Baksh shrine. His work is inside the dome of Hazrat Ghous-e-azam in Baghdad. His calligraphic work is displayed in the eastern art gallery in the Moscow museum. The government of Pakistan presented his work as a state gift to visiting heads of state.

Calligraphic skill
Gohar Qalam is a master of many styles of calligraphy, including Lahori Nastaleeq, Thuluth Kufic, Muhaqiq, Naskh, Tughra, Dewani, Ruqqaa Sumbali, Tajaweedh, Moshahy, Jaleel, Thuluth-e-Kabeer, Narjiss, Ijazaa, Thuluthian, English Gothic. He is also a master of cubist calligraphic art.

Awards
 1991 - Pride of Performance
 1990-Special award from the governor of Balochistan
 1990-Special award from the prime minister of Pakistan
 2005-Highest award from the foreign minister of Japan (33 international exhibits at the Metropolitan Museum of Tokyo)
 1999-Ali hejvari award from prime minister of Pakistan.

Books
 Jawahir-al-Galam
 Ajaib-ul-Quran.
 Naqash-e-Gohar.
 Naqash-e-Gohar (jaded)
 Naqash-e-Gohar (practical)
 Nisab-e-Khatati
 Ijaz-e-Khatati
 Muraqa-e-Gohar
 Muraqa-e-Loh o Qalam
 Makhzan-e-Khatati
 Tareekh-e-Khatati (old and new)
 Pearls of Calligraphy
 Wonders of calligraphy
 Fun-e-khatati
 Calligraphy Gohar Qalam
 Khat-e-Sadequain

As a writer
He is a writer of many drama serial such as Pukar, Noon-wal-Qalam, Musawir. He also wrote many stories in magazines and newspapers. Also a good poet.

References

1956 births
Pakistani calligraphers
Living people
pakistani artists